The 2017–18 Sacred Heart Pioneers men's basketball team represented Sacred Heart University during the 2017–18 NCAA Division I men's basketball season. This was the Pioneers' 19th season of NCAA Division I basketball, all played in the Northeast Conference. The Pioneers were led by fifth-year head coach Anthony Latina and played their home games at the William H. Pitt Center in Fairfield, Connecticut. They finished the season 10–21, 5–13 in NEC play to finish in ninth place, failing to make the NEC tournament.

Previous season 
The Pioneers finished the 2016–17 season 13–19, 8–10 in NEC play to finish in eighth place. They lost in the quarterfinals of the NEC tournament to Mount St. Mary's.

Preseason 
In a poll of league coaches at the NEC media day, the Pioneers were picked to finish in fifth place. Senior forward Joseph Lopez was named the preseason All-NEC team.

Roster

Schedule and results

|-
!colspan=9 style=| Non-conference regular season

  
|-
!colspan=9 style=| NEC Regular season

References 

Sacred Heart Pioneers men's basketball seasons
Sacred Heart
Sacred Heart Pioneers men's b
Sacred Heart Pioneers men's b